Ice Ages is an Austrian dark electro/industrial darkwave band signed to Napalm Records. The band is a one-man band consisting of Richard Lederer from Summoning and Die Verbannten Kinder Evas.

Biography
Richard Lederer began Ice Ages in 1997 with his debut album Strike the Ground. Since the release of Ice Ages' first album, there were significant delays before the three follow-up albums were released. After a three-year delay, The Killing Emptiness was released through Napalm Records in 2000 and, after eight more years, Buried Silence was released in 2008. In 2019, Nullify was released.

Line-up 
Richard Lederer - all instruments

Discography

Studio albums
Strike the Ground (1997)
This Killing Emptiness (2000)
Buried Silence (2008)
Nullify (2019)
Vibe of Scorn (2021)

References

External links 
Official website

Musical groups established in 1994
Austrian dark wave musical groups
Electro-industrial music groups
Napalm Records artists
1994 establishments in Austria